The 2010 Campeonato da 1ª Divisão do Futebol season was the 27th season of football in Macao and started on April 17, 2010, and ended on July 4, 2010, with Ka I becoming champions and Kuan Tai and Vá Luen being relegated. Teams played each other only once.

Standings

Results
Each team plays each other team once.

Campeonato da 1ª Divisão do Futebol seasons
Macau
Macau
1